State Highway 110 (SH 110) is a state highway in Silverton, Colorado. SH 110's western terminus is at U.S. Route 550 (US 550) in Silverton, and the eastern terminus is at the CDOT maintenance yard.

Route description

History
The route was established in the 1920s, when it began at US 550 in Silverton and headed north to Howardsville. SH 110 was extended north to Eureka by 1938. The northern terminus was moved to Gladstone in 1961. Except for the  left today, the entire route was deleted north of Silverton in 2003; signage was removed along the entire route. On November 24, 2006, CDOT no longer called SH 110 a real part of the state highway system; SH 110 still exists.

Major intersections

See also

 List of state highways in Colorado

References

External links

110
Transportation in San Juan County, Colorado
State highways in the United States shorter than one mile